Taradevi Harakhchand Kankaria Jain College is a self-financing undergraduate college in Kolkata, West Bengal, India. It was established in 2006 by kankaria group. It is affiliated with the University of Calcutta.

Departments

Science

Computer Science
Microbiology
Botany
Zoology

Arts and Commerce

Bengali
English
journalism and mass communication
Hindi
History
Geography
Political Science
Economics
Accountancy and Finance
Marketing
Business Administration

See also 
List of colleges affiliated to the University of Calcutta
Education in India
Education in West Bengal

References

External links
Taradevi Harakhchand Kankaria Jain College
Kankaria Group

Educational institutions established in 2006
University of Calcutta affiliates
Universities and colleges in Kolkata
Jain universities and colleges
2006 establishments in West Bengal